A beak is an anatomical structure of birds and turtles, serving as the mouth and jaws.

Beak may also refer to:

Anatomical structures
 Beak (bivalve), the oldest point on a bivalve mollusc's shell
 Beak (botany), a pointed projection on various plant parts
 Cephalopod beak, an 'inkfish' rostrum
 Rostrum (anatomy), various structures in fish, whales and invertebrates (colloquially called beak)

Arts and entertainment
 Beak (band), an English experimental electronic rock music group
 Beak (album), 2009
 Barnell Bohusk, a fictional Marvel Comics character
 "Beak", a Ty Beanie Buddy kiwi toy

British slang uses
 Cocaine
 Head teacher
 One of the teaching staff at these non-state schools:
Charterhouse School
Harrow School
Eton College
 Human nose
 Magistrate (England and Wales)

Other uses
 Beak Island, Prince Gustav Channel
 Beak, a type of molding
 Beak, a spout of a vessel such as a laboratory beaker

See also 
 Beakhead, a protruding structure on the bow of sailing ships
 Parrot's Beak (disambiguation)